Domaradz  is a village in Brzozów County, Subcarpathian Voivodeship, in south-eastern Poland. It is the seat of the gmina (administrative district) called Gmina Domaradz. One of the old churches from Domaradz is entered into UNESCO World Heritage Site.

The village has a population of 3,100.

See also
 Walddeutsche

References

Domaradz